3402 Wisdom, provisional designation , is a stony asteroid and Mars-crosser on an eccentric orbit from the inner regions of the asteroid belt, approximately  in diameter. It was discovered on 5 August 1981, by American astronomer Edward Bowell at Lowell's Anderson Mesa Station near Flagstaff, Arizona, in the United States. The presumed bright S-type asteroid has a rotation period of 4.99 hours. It was named after American planetary scientist Jack Wisdom.

Orbit and classification 

Wisdom is a Mars-crossing asteroid, a member of a dynamically unstable group, located between the main belt and the near-Earth populations, and crossing the orbit of Mars at 1.666 AU. It orbits the Sun at a distance of 1.5–2.7 AU once every 3 years and 1 month (1,137 days; semi-major axis of 2.13 AU). Its orbit has an eccentricity of 0.28 and an inclination of 5° with respect to the ecliptic.

The body's observation arc begins with a precovery taken at Palomar Observatory in February 1977, more than 4 years prior to its official discovery observation at Anderson Mesa.

Physical characteristics 

Wisdom is an assumed stony S-type asteroid.

Rotation period 

In October 2006, two rotational lightcurves of Wisdom were obtained from photometric observations at Ondřejov, Skalnaté pleso and Carbuncle Hill observatories. Lightcurve analysis gave a well-defined rotation period of 4.9949 and 4.9951 hours with a high brightness variation of 0.75 and 0.74 magnitude, respectively. A high brightness amplitude typically indicate that the body has an elongated rather than spherical shape.

Diameter and albedo 

According to the survey carried out by the NEOWISE mission of NASA's Wide-field Infrared Survey Explorer, Wisdom measures 2.05 and 2.50 kilometers in diameter and its surface has an albedo of 0.32 and 0.283, respectively. The Collaborative Asteroid Lightcurve Link assumes a standard albedo for stony asteroids of 0.20 and derives a diameter of 2.59 kilometers based on an absolute magnitude of 15.34.

With a mean-diameter of approximately 2.5 kilometers, Wisdom is one of the smaller mid-sized Mars-crossing asteroids. It is assumed that there are up to 10 thousand Mars-crossers larger than 1 kilometer. The largest members of this dynamical group are 132 Aethra, 323 Brucia, 2204 Lyyli and 512 Taurinensis, which measure between 43 and 25 kilometers in diameter.

Naming 

This minor planet was named after Jack Wisdom (born 1953), a dynamicist and professor of planetary sciences at MIT. Wisdom pioneered in the study of the dynamics and long-term stability of the Solar System, and demonstrated the dynamical mechanism for the clearing of asteroid in the Kirkwood gaps of the asteroid belt. The official naming citation was published by the Minor Planet Center on 2 February 1988.

Notes

References

External links 
 Asteroid Lightcurve Database (LCDB), query form (info )
 Dictionary of Minor Planet Names, Google books
 Discovery Circumstances: Numbered Minor Planets (1)-(5000) – Minor Planet Center
 
 

003402
Discoveries by Edward L. G. Bowell
Named minor planets
19810805